Munoai  may refer to:
 Amphisbaena munoai, Klappenbach, 1966, a worm lizard species in the genus Amphisbaena found in Brazil
 Leptotyphlops munoai, a blind snake species

Subspecies
 Leopardus braccatus munoai, Ximenez, 1961, a subspecies of the Pantanal cat, a small feline of Brazil, Paraguay, and Uruguay